The 1995 Hessian state election was held on 19 February 1995 to elect the members of the Landtag of Hesse. The incumbent coalition government of the Social Democratic Party (SPD) and The Greens led by Minister-President Hans Eichel was returned with a slightly increased majority and continued in office.

Parties
The table below lists parties represented in the previous Landtag of Hesse.

Election result

|-
! colspan="2" | Party
! Votes
! %
! +/-
! Seats 
! +/-
! Seats %
|-
| bgcolor=| 
| align=left | Christian Democratic Union (CDU)
| align=right| 1,084,146
| align=right| 39.2
| align=right| 1.0
| align=right| 45
| align=right| 1
| align=right| 40.9
|-
| bgcolor=| 
| align=left | Social Democratic Party (SPD)
| align=right| 1,051,452
| align=right| 38.0
| align=right| 2.8
| align=right| 44
| align=right| 2
| align=right| 40.0
|-
| bgcolor=| 
| align=left | Alliance 90/The Greens (Grüne)
| align=right| 309,897
| align=right| 11.2
| align=right| 2.4
| align=right| 13
| align=right| 3
| align=right| 11.8
|-
| bgcolor=| 
| align=left | Free Democratic Party (FDP)
| align=right| 206,173
| align=right| 7.4
| align=right| 0.0
| align=right| 8
| align=right| ±0
| align=right| 7.3
|-
! colspan=8|
|-
| bgcolor=|
| align=left | The Republicans (REP)
| align=right| 54,775
| align=right| 2.0
| align=right| 0.3
| align=right| 0
| align=right| ±0
| align=right| 0
|-
| bgcolor=|
| align=left | Others
| align=right| 62,378
| align=right| 2.3
| align=right| 
| align=right| 0
| align=right| ±0
| align=right| 0
|-
! align=right colspan=2| Total
! align=right| 2,768,821
! align=right| 100.0
! align=right| 
! align=right| 110
! align=right| ±0
! align=right| 
|-
! align=right colspan=2| Voter turnout
! align=right| 
! align=right| 66.3
! align=right| 4.5
! align=right| 
! align=right| 
! align=right| 
|}

Sources
 Landtagswahlen in Hessen 1946 — 2009 

1995
Hesse
Hessian state election